Habtamu Fikadu (born 13 March 1988 in Shewa) is an Ethiopian runner. He won the bronze medal in the 400 metres at the 2005 African Junior Athletics Championships.

He was the 2007 winner of the Obudu Ranch International Mountain Race, which brought him US$50,000 in prize money, and he repeated the feat two years later in 2009. He was runner-up at the 2010 competition, taking the silver medal for the African Mountain Running Championships.

Achievements

Personal bests
400 metres - 46.79 s (2006)
3000 metres - 7:57.78 min (2006)
10,000 metres - 27:06.47 min (2007)

References

External links

1988 births
Living people
Ethiopian male long-distance runners
21st-century Ethiopian people